James Franklin Battin (February 13, 1925 – September 27, 1996) was a Republican United States Representative from Montana, and later was a United States district judge of the United States District Court for the District of Montana.

Education and career

Born in Wichita, Kansas, Battin moved with his parents to Montana in November 1929. He was educated in the public schools of Billings, then the third largest city in the state, graduating from high school there in 1942. He enlisted in the United States Navy and served for three years, two and a half years of which were in the Pacific theater of operations. He returned to his studies and graduated with a Bachelor of Arts degree in 1948 from Eastern Montana College (now Montana State University Billings) in Billings. He received a Juris Doctor from George Washington University Law School in 1951, and was in private practice of law in Washington, D.C. from 1951 to 1952, then in Billings from 1953 to 1960. He was a deputy county attorney of Yellowstone County, Montana from 1953 to 1955, then general counsel and secretary of the City-County Planning Board of Billings in 1955. In 1955 he became an assistant city attorney of Billings, and was the city attorney from 1957 to 1958. He served as member of the Montana House of Representatives in 1958 and 1959. Battin was elected as a Republican to the Eighty-seventh and to the three succeeding Congresses, and served from January 3, 1961, until his resignation February 27, 1969, to become United States District Judge.

Federal judicial service

Battin was nominated by President Richard Nixon on February 20, 1969, to a seat on the United States District Court for the District of Montana vacated by Judge William James Jameson. He was confirmed by the United States Senate on February 25, 1969, and received his commission on February 27, 1969. He served as Chief Judge from November 16, 1978, to February 13, 1990. He assumed senior status on February 13, 1990. His service terminated on September 27, 1996, due to his death in Billings.

Family and honor

The James F. Battin Courthouse in Billings is named for him. Battin's son, Jim, was elected to the California State Assembly in 1994.

Notable case

One of the cases that Battin handled was the conviction of four counts of extortion of the Louisiana Teamsters Union business agent Edward Grady Partin, the one who supplied the immunized testimony that sent Jimmy Hoffa to prison.

References

Sources
 
 

1925 births
1996 deaths
Politicians from Wichita, Kansas
Politicians from Billings, Montana
George Washington University Law School alumni
Republican Party members of the Montana House of Representatives
Judges of the United States District Court for the District of Montana
United States district court judges appointed by Richard Nixon
20th-century American judges
Republican Party members of the United States House of Representatives from Montana
Montana State University Billings alumni
20th-century American lawyers
20th-century American politicians